Max Hess (December 29, 1877 – June 22, 1969) was an American gymnast and track and field athlete who competed in the 1904 Summer Olympics. He was born in Coburg, Germany and died in Philadelphia, Pennsylvania. In 1904 he won the gold medal in the team event. He was also 10th in athletics' triathlon event, 31st in gymnastics' all-around competition and 50th in gymnastics' triathlon event.

References

1877 births
1969 deaths
American male artistic gymnasts
Athletes (track and field) at the 1904 Summer Olympics
Gymnasts at the 1904 Summer Olympics
Olympic gymnasts of the United States
Olympic gold medalists for the United States in track and field
Olympic medalists in gymnastics
Medalists at the 1904 Summer Olympics
American male triathletes
20th-century American people